Coloman of Halych  (1208 – 1241) was the rulerfrom 1214 prince, and from 1215 or 1216 to 1221 kingof Halych, and duke of Slavonia from 1226 to his death. He was the second son of Andrew II of Hungary and Gertrude of Merania. His father and Leszek the White, Duke of Poland, concluded an agreement about the marriage of Coloman and Leszek's daughter, Salomea, and the division of Halych, allotting its western regions to Leszek, the remaining lands to Coloman. The Hungarian and Polish armies occupied the principality in late 1214. Andrew II appointed a Hungarian nobleman, Benedict the Bald, to administer it on Coloman's behalf. Coloman was crowned the first king of Halych with the pope's authorization in early 1216.

After the Hungarian troops occupied the western Galician territories, Leszek made an alliance with Mstislav Mstislavich, Prince of Novgorod. Mstislav invaded Halych, forcing Coloman and his supporters to flee to Hungary, most probably in early 1219. Mstislav supported his son-in-law, Daniel Romanovichwho had claimed Halych since 1205to invade Polish territories, which brought about a reconciliation between Andrew II and Leszek. The Hungarians and Poles again occupied Halych and restored it to Coloman in the autumn of 1219. Mstislav and his Cuman allies defeated the Hungarians near Halych and captured Coloman and Salomea in August 1221. To secure their release, Andrew II renounced Halych and arranged a marriage alliance between his youngest son, Andrew, and Mstislav's daughter.

Coloman returned to Hungary in late 1221 or 1222. He settled in Szepes (now Spiš in Slovakia) where he had held large estates since the late 1210s. Andrew II made him duke of Slavonia, with jurisdiction also in Croatia and Dalmatia, in 1226. He cooperated with his eldest brother, Béla, in revising their father's donations already during Andrew II's lifetime.

Early life

Coloman was the second son of Andrew II of Hungary and his first wife, Gertrude of Merania. Andrew's father (Coloman's grandfather), Béla III of Hungary, was the first king of Hungary to conquer the Principality of Halych in 1188. Béla granted Halych to the teenager Andrew, but Andrew was unpopular, especially because his troops did not respect the Galicians' Orthodox faith. The Galicians expelled him in 1189 or 1190, but he did not abandon his claim to Halych. After Roman Mstislavich, who had united the principalities of Volhynia and Halych under his rule, died fighting against the Poles in 1205, Andrew launched a military campaign against Halych in almost each year. He adopted the title of "King of Galicia and Lodomeria" in token of his claim to both principalities. Initially, he supported Roman Mstislavich's minor sons, Daniel and Vasilko Romanovich, against Vladimir Igorevich and his brothers, who also claimed Halych.

Coloman was born in 1208. According to historians Márta Font and Gábor Barabás, he was named most probably for Coloman of Stockerau, an Irish pilgrim who had been martyred in Austria in 1012. Coloman's mother showed blatant favoritism towards her German kinsmen and courtiers, which outraged the native lords. She was murdered by a group of Hungarian noblemen in September 1213, shortly after her husband departed for a new military campaign against Halych. Andrew returned to Hungary, but only after appointing a Galician boyar (or nobleman), Vladislav Kormilichich, to lead the Hungarian army to Halych. Kormilichich took control of the principality on Andrew's behalf. Leszek the White, Duke of Poland, granted asylum to Daniel and Vasilko Romanovich and made an alliance with princes Alexandr Vsevolodovich of Vladimir and Mstislav Yaroslavich of Peresopnytsia. They invaded Halych and routed Kormilichich, but they could not capture the capital of the principality.

In a letter to Pope Innocent III, Andrew stated that Galician boyars had proposed him to grant Halych to Coloman. According to the Galician–Volhynian Chronicle, Leszek the White was the first to suggest the same idea, also proposing his daughter, Salomea, to Coloman. Andrew and Leszek had a meeting in Szepes in the autumn of 1214. They reached a compromise, which included the marriage of Coloman and Salomea and the cession of two western Galician towns, Przemyśl and Lubaczów, to Leszek. The Hungarian and Polish armies invaded the principality and put an end to Vladislav Kormilichich's rule before the end of the year.

Halych

Coloman was installed in Halych soon after the fall of Kormilichich. Since Coloman was a minor, Benedict the Bald was appointed to administer the principality. Another Hungarian nobleman, Demetrius Aba, was made the master of the stewards in Coloman's court before 1216. Kormilichich's former ally, Sudislav, was one of the leading Galician boyars who supported Coloman.

Andrew sent a letter to Pope Innocent, requesting him to authorize John, Archbishop of Esztergom to anoint Coloman as king. In his next letter, Andrew thanked the pope for giving consent to Coloman's coronation, but also informed him that a riot had broken out against Coloman and the rebels laid siege to Halych. Andrew urged Innocent to send a legate and a golden crown to Coloman to strengthen the legitimacy of his rule. Pope Honorius III mentioned in a letter in 1222 that the Archbishop of Esztergom had crowned Coloman "with the blessing of the Holy See", but the circumstances of the ceremony are unknown. Historians Font, Barabás and Karol Hollý inferred from the correspondence that Coloman was most probably crowned twice: first (in late 1214 or early 1215) with a provisional crown in Hungary, later (probably in early 1216) with the crown sent by the pope. Other historiansincluding Tibor Almási, Nataša Procházková and Đura Hardiconclude that Coloman was first anointed, and he was only once crowned, in early 1216.

The relationship between Andrew and Leszek the White had meanwhile become tense. Leszek granted Vladimir-in-Vohynia, which was the most prestigious princely seat in Volhynia, to Daniel and Vasilko Romanovich. He also failed to support Coloman during the siege of Halych. The Hungarian army invaded western Galicia and captured Przemyśl and Lubaczów in late 1215 or early 1216. Leszek approached Mstislav Mstislavich, Prince of Novgorod, seeking his assistance against the Hungarians. The reconstruction of the ensuing events is difficult, because their dating is uncertain. Mstislav invaded Halych between 1215 and 1219most probably in early 1219, according to Font and Barabásand forced Coloman, Benedict the Bald and Sudislav to flee to Hungary.

Mstislav gave his daughter, Anna, in marriage to Daniel Romanovich who soon occupied the lands between the rivers Wieprz and Bug from Leszek. Outraged by Daniel's attack, Leszek made a new alliance with Andrew II. Their united forces defeated Mstislav's army in three battles in October 1219. Mstislav and Daniel were forced to abandon Halych and Coloman returned to the principality. Andrew most probably made Sudislav's son-in-law, Philnius, the commander of the Hungarian army in Halych around this time, according to Font and Barabás.

Mstislav hired Cumans and again invaded Halych in late 1220 or early 1221, but could not capture the capital. Mstislav's fiasco encouraged Philnius to join Leszek's campaign against Volhynia, leaving Coloman and Salomea in the newly fortified Church of the Virgin Mary in Halych. Taking advantage of the absence of the bulk of the Hungarian army, Mstislav and the Cumans laid siege Halych in August 1221. Philnius hurried back from his campaign, but Mstislav defeated his army and he could only flee with the help of a Galician boyar, Zhiroslav on 14 August. Coloman's retainers tried to resist in the fortified church, but the lack of water forced them to surrender. The Polish chronicler, Jan Długosz, wrote that Coloman and Salomea were imprisoned in the fortress of Torchesk.

Internal strifes in Hungary prevented Coloman's father from launching a military expedition against Mstislav. Andrew entered into negotiations with Mstislav and they reached a compromise in late 1221 or early 1222. According to the agreement, Coloman was to renounce the title of King of Halych, but Mstislav agreed to give his daughter, Maria, in marriage to Coloman's younger brother, Andrew, to whom Coloman's royal title would be transferred.

Kingdom of Hungary

Szepes

After his release in late 1221 or early 1222, Coloman returned to Hungary. His father soon approached Pope Honorius III, asking him to invalidate his agreement with Mstislav. The pope only cancelled the provision about the transfer of Coloman's royal title to his younger brother, because the pope preserved the right to decide about coronations. Coloman styled himself "King of Galicia" till the end of his life, although he never returned to Halych. He and his wife settled in Szepes, near the Hungarian-Galician border. Font and Barabás say that Coloman had received estates in the region already in the late 1210s. A late source (a 1279 letter of Elizabeth the Cuman) mentioned that Coloman had held Szepes till the end of his life.

Coloman's activities in Szepes are poorly documented. He granted privileges to the "guest settlers" in Szepesolaszi (now Spišské Vlachy in Slovakia). He made donations to the Cistercian monastery which was established in the 1220s in Szepes. Coloman also supported the establishment of the Premonstratensian provostry at Jászó (now Jasov in Slovakia). According to a scholarly theory, the tower of the Szepes Castle was built on Coloman's order.

Slavonia

Andrew II entrusted Coloman with the government of Slavonia, Croatia and Dalmatia in 1226. The three provinces had been administered by Coloman's elder brother, Béla, who was appointed to administer Translyvania. Coloman's jurisdiction also included counties located in Hungary proper, such as Baranya, Pozsega, Somogy, Valkó, Varasd and Zala.

In the summer of 1226, Coloman visited Dalmatia where he was ceremoniously received in the towns. He made donations to the Bishopric of Trogir and confirmed his mother's grant to the Hájszentlőrinc Chapter. His following extant diplomas were issued in 1229. Estates located in Szepes were the subjects of both diplomas, implying that Coloman had mostly stayed in Szepes from 1226 to 1229, according to Font and Barabás.

Coloman supported Béla's attempts to revise their father's grants already during Andrew II's lifetime. The two brothers jointly confirmed a grant made by a previous ban of Croatia in 1231. Coloman ignored the privileges of the Knights Templar and wanted to collect taxes on their estates. The pope appointed Bartholomew le Gros, the bishop of Pécs, to arbitrate in the dispute together with the abbot of Pécsvárad Abbey and the provost of Pécs Chapter, but also forbade them to excommunicate Coloman without his special authorization. The three prelates persuaded Coloman to confirm the knights' privileges on 31 July 1231, but a full reconciliation was reached only after lengthy negotiations in 1239.

Coloman granted liberties to the German, Saxon, Hungarian and Slavic "guest settlers" of Vukovar in 1239. He also confirmed the right of the "guest settlers" of Varaždin to elect their judges and put their obligations in writing.

Coloman initiated the merger of the Archbishopric of Split and the Bishopric of Zagreb, but Pope Gregory IX reminded him in 1240, that the two dioceses could not be united without the consent of the archbishop of Kalocsa and the chapters of their sees.

In 1231, Coloman granted privileges to Vukovar. Coloman, similarly to his brother, opposed his father's third marriage with Beatrice d'Este and following the death of King Andrew II (21 September 1235) they accused their young stepmother of adultery.

Pope Gregory IX persuaded him to pursue the heretics in his provinces and in the adjacent territories; therefore he invaded and occupied Bosnia and Zachlumia but he could not wind up Bogomilism. He supported the establishment of the Diocese of Bosnia and he granted Đakovo to its bishop. When he was informed that the Mongols invaded the kingdom, he joined his brother's troops. However, their troops were defeated at the Battle of Mohi (11 April 1241). Coloman suffered serious wounds and died of his injuries a few weeks after the battle.

Titles

Coloman was styled "by the Grace of God, king of the Ruthenians, and by his glorious father's generosity, duke of Dalmatia and Croatia" in his first extant charter in 1226. Göncöl, Archbishop of Split, referred to Coloman as "king and duke of Slavonia" in 1229. The first document mentioning Coloman's rule in "whole Slavonia" was issued by the Zagreb Chapter in 1230. He was consequently styled as "king, and duke of whole Slavonia" from the late 1230s.

Ancestry

Notes

References

Sources

External links

1208 births
1241 deaths
House of Árpád
Kings of Rus'
Dukes of Slavonia
13th-century Hungarian people
13th century in Ukraine
13th century in Kievan Rus'
Hungarian princes
Hungarian military personnel killed in the Mongol invasion of Europe